Kniatowy  is a village in the administrative district of Gmina Czastary, within Wieruszów County, Łódź Voivodeship, in central Poland.

References

Kniatowy